"North Country" is a song recorded by Canadian music group The Rankin Family. It was released in 1993 as the second single from their third studio album, North Country. It peaked in the top 10 on the RPM Country Tracks and Adult Contemporary Tracks charts.

Chart performance

Year-end charts

References

1993 songs
1993 singles
The Rankin Family songs
EMI Records singles
Songs written by Jimmy Rankin